Joseph Scott Schmick (born April 7, 1958) is an American farmer, businessman, and politician from Washington. Schmick is a Republican member of the Washington House of Representatives, representing the 9th Legislative District. Representative Schmick introduced legislation to give away 130 miles of the John Wayne trail back to private landowners effectively closing a large part of the longest Rail-to-Trail in the country. The legislation was nullified as a result of a typo.

Awards 
 2014 Guardians of Small Business award. Presented by NFIB.
 2020 Guardians of Small Business. Presented by NFIB.

References

Republican Party members of the Washington House of Representatives
Living people
1958 births
21st-century American politicians